14 October is an Arabic daily newspaper published in Aden, Yemen. The paper has been in circulation since 1968. The paper was named after the revolution in the South of Yemen on 14 October 1967.

History and profile
14 October was started in 1968. It is published in Arabic and is headquartered in Aden. It was formerly run by the government of South Yemen before the reunification in 1990. It is run by the state of Yemen, and its publisher is the 14th October Foundation for Journalism, Printing and Publishing. As of 2014 Ahmed Mohammed Alhubaishi was the editor-in-chief of the daily. Another editor-in-chief was Riadh Mahfouz Sharaf who escaped Aden in August 2019 when the offices of the paper were occupied by the militants allegedly supported by the United Arab Emirates.

14 October mostly provides news offered by the Saba news agency, the official news agency of Yemen. At the end of 2010, the paper had a circulation of 20,000 copies.

See also
 List of newspapers in Yemen

References

External links
 

1968 establishments in Yemen
Arabic-language newspapers
Mass media in Aden
Newspapers published in Yemen
Publications established in 1968
State media